The 2013 Alcorn State Braves football team represented Alcorn State University in the 2013 NCAA Division I FCS football season. The Braves were led by second year head coach Jay Hopson and played their home games at Casem-Spinks Stadium. They are a member of the East Division of the Southwestern Athletic Conference (SWAC). The Braves finished the season with a  record.

On Media Day, Alcorn State was picked to finish fifth in the Eastern Division of the SWAC. They had one player, defensive back Jamison Knox, that was picked to the Pre-season All-SWAC 2nd Team Defense.

Schedule

^Games will air on a tape delayed basis

References

Alcorn State
Alcorn State Braves football seasons
Alcorn State Braves football